Bangladeshis in the Maldives are a part of the Bangladeshi diaspora, consists people of Bangladeshi descent who have immigrated to or were born in another country. In most cases, first generation migrants may have moved abroad from Bangladesh for better living conditions, to escape poverty, or to send money back to families in Bangladesh. Till now, most Bangladeshis in the Maldives are first generation immigrants.

The 14th-century Moroccan traveller Ibn Battuta identified Sultan Salahuddin Salih as a Bengali and credited him for the establishment of a new dynasty in the Maldives including his son Omar I and a granddaughter, Khadijah. Other records have also mentioned a granddaughter of Alauddin Husain Shah being a queen in the Maldives too.

According to the Maldivian foreign ministry some 80,000 Bangladeshi are now (2021) working in the Maldives, a nation of only around 400,000 people, with one-third having no valid documents or registration  This is a major portion among all the foreign workers in the Maldives.

References

Maldives
Bangladesh–Maldives relations
Ethnic groups in the Maldives